

American

British

Canadian

French

Greek

Indian

New Zealand

Thomas and Lord, Part One, page 50, say that HQ NZ Maadi Camp was allocated the deception identity "HQ 6 NZ Division," HQ Company II NZ Maadi Camp became "6 NZ Div Defence Platoon," 1 NZ Works Section became "25 NZ Field Company" [NZE]; the NZ Artillery Training Depot became "32 NZ Field Company;" the NZ Infantry Training Depot became notionally "9 NZ Infantry Brigade;" the Northern, Central, and Southern Companies became 31, 32, and 33 "Battalions;" the NZ Base Field Security Section became, notionally, "6 NZ Division Field Security Section;" NZ Base Signals became "6 NZ Division Signals;" the NZ Base Provost Company notionally became the non-existent "6 NZ Provost Company;" HQ NZ Base NZ Army Service Corps became "HQ 6 NZ Division Army Service Corps;" the NZ Base Supply Depot became "6 NZ Div Sup Company;" the NZ Base Transport Platoon took on the non-existent identity of "17 NZ General Transport Company;" the NZ Base Ordnance Workshops became the "6 NZ Division Ordnance Workshops;" 1 NZ Camp Hospital became "23 NZ Field Ambulance;" and the NZ Base Hygiene Section became the "6 NZ Division Hygiene Section."

Polish

South Africa

Notes
 Footnotes

 Citations

References

Further reading

 

Military units and formations of the British Empire in World War II
Fictional units of World War II